American rock band Marilyn Manson and its eponymous vocalist have received numerous awards and accolades. Formed in 1989 in Fort Lauderdale, Florida by Manson and the band's original guitarist Daisy Berkowitz, their highly visualized concerts quickly gained them a reputation in the South Florida area. The Miami New Times named Marilyn Manson and the Spooky Kids – the earliest incarnation of the band – the 'Best Local Heavy Metal Band' in 1992. The following year, the band – who, by now, had shortened their name to Marilyn Manson – won two awards at the second annual South Florida Slammies. They would go on to win a further seven Slammies over the next three years, making them the second-most decorated band in the awards' history.

The band had its first legitimate hit in 1995 with a cover of Eurythmics' "Sweet Dreams (Are Made of This)". Its video was nominated in the Best Rock Video category at the 1996 MTV Video Music Awards. The lead single from the band's second studio album, "The Beautiful People", was nominated for three awards at the 1997 ceremony, while Marilyn Manson was named 'Best New Artist' by Rolling Stone. "The Dope Show" was released the following year, and the band received the first of a total of four Grammy Award nominations, this time for Best Hard Rock Performance. "The Dope Show" won two awards at the 1998 Billboard Music Video Awards, as well as the award for Best Cinematography at the 1999 VMAs.

The band's frontman has received nominations for his work as a music video director. He was nominated, along with co-director Robert Hales, for 'Best Modern Rock Clip of the Year' at the 2000 Billboard Music Video Awards for his work on Nine Inch Nails' "Starfuckers, Inc." The band have also received numerous international awards and nominations throughout their career, including NME and Q Awards, MTV Europe Music Awards and the Echo Music Prize. They have won six Kerrang! Awards from a total of eight nominations, and were inducted into their Hall of Fame in 2000. Their ninth studio album, The Pale Emperor, was released in 2015 and was nominated for 'Album of the Year' at both the Alternative Press Music Awards and at online magazine Loudwire, while Rolling Stone dubbed it the 'Best Metal Album of 2015'. Marilyn Manson have sold in excess of 50 million records worldwide.

Alternative Press Music Awards
The Alternative Press Music Awards is an annual music awards show, founded by music magazine Alternative Press in 2014. Marilyn Manson have won one award from two nominations.

!
|-
!scope="row" rowspan="2"|2016
|The Pale Emperor
|Album of the Year
|
|style="text-align:center;"|
|-
|Marilyn Manson
|Icon Award
|
|style="text-align:center;"|
|-
|}

Billboard Music Video Awards
The Billboard Music Video Awards is an annual awards show, founded by the music magazine Billboard and first held in 1989. Marilyn Manson have won three awards from four nominations, including one for the Maximum Vision Award, which "honors the video that best advances an artist's career".

!
|-
!scope="row"|1997
| "The Beautiful People"
|Hard Rock Clip of the Year
|
|style="text-align:center;"|
|-
!scope="row" rowspan="2"|1998
|rowspan="2"|"The Dope Show"
|Best Hard Rock/Metal Video
|
|style="text-align:center;" rowspan="2"|
|-
|Maximum Vision Award
|
|-
!scope="row"|2000
|Nine Inch Nails – "Starfuckers, Inc."
|Best Modern Rock Clip of the Year
|
|style="text-align:center;"|
|-
|}

BMI Awards
Broadcast Music, Inc. (BMI) is one of three performing rights organizations in the United States, along with ASCAP and SESAC. It collects license fees on behalf of songwriters, composers, and music publishers and distributes them as royalties to those members whose works have been performed. The BMI Awards have been held annually since 1952 to award songwriters in various genres, including country, pop and rock.

!
|- 
!scope="row"| 2005
| "Personal Jesus"
| Pop Award 
| 
|style="text-align:center;"|

Berlin Music Video Awards
The Berlin Music Video Awards (BMVA) is an international festival that puts filmmakers and the art behind music videos in the spotlight. Supporting both unknown and famous artists, it is a primary networking event for the video and music industries in Europe. The Berlin Music Video Awards offers 13 different categories, including: Best Animation, Narrative, Song, Low Budget, Cinematography, Art Director, Director, VFX, Editor, Concept, Experimental, Most Bizarre and Trashy.
Manson's music video for God's Gonna Cut You Down, filmed by Justin Moro, was nominated for Best Cinematography in 2020.

!
|- 
!scope="row"|2020
| "God's Gonna Cut You Down"
| Best Cinematography
| 
|

Best Art Vinyl
The Best Art Vinyl award has been awarded since 2005 by Art Vinyl Ltd for the best album artwork of the past year. The award is judged by public vote from a list of 50 nominations from music industry and graphic design experts.

!
|- 
!scope="row"|2020
| We Are Chaos
| Best Vinyl Art
| 
|

Echo Music Prize
The Echo Music Prize is an accolade by the Deutsche Phono-Akademie, an association of German recording companies, to recognize outstanding achievements in the German music industry. The awards were first held in 1992, and Marilyn Manson have received one nomination.

!
|-
!scope="row"|2008
|Marilyn Manson
|Best International Rock/Pop Group
|
|style="text-align:center;"|
|}

GAFFA-Prisen Awards
The GAFFA Awards (Danish: GAFFA Prisen) is a Danish music award that was founded in 1991 by Danish publication Gaffa. Marilyn Manson received two nominations in 2021.

!
|-
|rowspan="2"|2021
| We Are Chaos
| International Record of the Year
| 
|style="text-align:center;" rowspan="2"|
|-
| Marilyn Manson
| International Soloist of the Year
| 
|-
|}

Grammy Awards
A Grammy Award is an honor awarded by the National Academy of Recording Arts and Sciences of the United States to recognize outstanding achievement in the mainly English-language music industry. Marilyn Manson have received four nominations, while Manson himself earned an additional nomination for his work on Kanye West's 2021 studio album Donda.

!
|-
!scope="row"|1999
|"The Dope Show"
|Best Hard Rock Performance
|
|rowspan="4" style="text-align:center;"|
|-
!scope="row"|2001
|"Astonishing Panorama of the Endtimes"
|rowspan="2"|Best Metal Performance
|
|-
!scope="row"|2004
|"mOBSCENE"
|
|-
!scope="row"|2013
|"No Reflection"
|Best Hard Rock/Metal Performance
|
|-
!scope="row"|2022
|Donda (as featured artist)
|Album of the Year
|
|style="text-align:center;"|
|}

Hungarian Music Awards
The Hungarian Music Awards are the national music awards of Hungary, founded in 1992 by the country's chart and certification body, Mahasz. Marilyn Manson received two nominations for Hard Rock/Metal Album of the Year, in 2010 and 2018, losing to Rammstein's Liebe ist für alle da and Stone Sour's Hydrograd, respectively.

!
|-
!scope="row"|2010
| The High End of Low
| rowspan=2|Hard Rock/Metal Album of the Year 
| 
|style="text-align:center;"|
|-
!scope="row"|2018
| Heaven Upside Down
| 
|style="text-align:center;"|

Kerrang! Awards
The Kerrang! Awards is an annual awards ceremony founded in 1993 by British rock magazine Kerrang!. Marilyn Manson have received six awards from eight nominations.

!
|-
!scope="row" rowspan=2|1997
|rowspan="4"|Marilyn Manson
| Best International Live Act
| 
| rowspan=2|
|-
| rowspan=2|Best Best in the World
| 
|-
!scope="row"|1999
|
|style="text-align:center;"|
|-
!scope="row"|2000
|Hall of Fame
|
|style="text-align:center;"|
|-
!scope="row"|2001
|Holy Wood (In the Shadow of the Valley of Death)
|Best Album
|
|style="text-align:center;"|
|-
!scope="row" rowspan="2"|2002
|rowspan="2"|"Tainted Love"
|Best Single
|
|style="text-align:center;"|
|-
|rowspan="2"|Best Video
|
|style="text-align:center;"|
|-
!scope="row"|2003
|"mOBSCENE"
|
| style="text-align:center;"|
|-
!scope="row"|2005
|rowspan="2"|Marilyn Manson
|Kerrang! Icon
|
|style="text-align:center;"|
|-
!scope="row" |2015
|Lifetime Achievement Award
|
|style="text-align:center;"|
|}

Loudwire Music Awards
The Loudwire Music Awards have been awarded annually since 2011 by the American online magazine Loudwire. Marilyn Manson have received two awards from six nominations.

!
|-
!scope="row" rowspan="3"|2012
|Born Villain
|Rock Album of the Year
|
|style="text-align:center;"|
|-
| rowspan="2"|"No Reflection"
|Rock Song of the Year
|
|style="text-align:center;"|
|-
|Rock Video of the Year
|
|style="text-align:center;"|
|-
!scope="row" rowspan="3"|2015
|The Pale Emperor
|Best Rock Album
|
|rowspan="3" style="text-align:center;"|
|-
| rowspan="2"|"The Mephistopheles of Los Angeles"
|Best Rock Song
|
|-
|Best Rock Video
|
|}

MTV Awards

MTV Europe Music Awards
The MTV Europe Music Awards (EMAs) were established in 1994 by MTV Networks Europe to celebrate the most popular music in Europe. Marilyn Manson have received two nominations.

!
|-
!scope="row" |1998
|rowspan="2"|Marilyn Manson
|rowspan="2"|Best Rock
|
|style="text-align:center;"|
|-
!scope="row" |1999
|
|style="text-align:center;"|
|}

MTV Video Music Awards
The MTV Video Music Awards, commonly abbreviated as VMA, were established in 1984 by MTV to celebrate the top music videos of the year. Marilyn Manson have received one award from five nominations.

!
|-
!scope="row" style="text-align:center;"| 
| "Sweet Dreams (Are Made of This)"
|rowspan="2"|Best Rock Video
| 
| style="text-align:center;"|
|-
!scope="row" rowspan="3" style="text-align:center;"| 
| rowspan="3"| "The Beautiful People"
| 
| rowspan="3" style="text-align:center;"|
|-
| Best Special Effects in a Video
| 
|-
| Best Art Direction in a Video
| 
|-
!scope="row" style="text-align:center;"| 
| "The Dope Show"
| Best Cinematography in a Video
| 
|style="text-align:center;"|
|}

Music Video Production Awards
The MVPAs are annually presented by a Los Angeles-based music trade organization to honor the year's best music videos.

!
|-
!scope="row" rowspan="3"|1997
| rowspan="3"|"The Beautiful People"
| Best Editing
| 
|rowspan="3" style="text-align:center;"|
|-
| Best Art Direction
| 
|-
| Best Styling
| 
|-
!scope="row" rowspan="2"|1998
| rowspan="2"|"The Dope Show"
| Best Director
| 
|rowspan="2" style="text-align:center;"|
|-
|rowspan="2"|Rock Video of the Year
| 
|-
!scope="row" rowspan="3"|2001
| rowspan="2"|"Disposable Teens"
| 
|rowspan="3" style="text-align:center;"|
|-
| Best Cinematography
| 
|-
| "The Fight Song"
| rowspan="2"|Best Colorist/Telecine 
| 
|-
!scope="row" rowspan="2"| 2005
| rowspan="2"| "Personal Jesus"
| 
|rowspan="2" style="text-align:center;"|
|-
| Best Cinematography
|

NME Awards
The NME Awards are an annual music awards show founded by the British music magazine NME and first held in 1953. Marilyn Manson have received one award from one nomination.

!
|-
!scope="row"|2001
|Marilyn Manson
|Best Metal Act
|
|style="text-align:center;"|
|}

O Music Awards
The O Music Awards is an awards show presented by Viacom to honor music, technology and intersection between the two. The first O Music Awards ceremony was held on April 28, 2011, on Fremont Street in Downtown Las Vegas.

!
|-
!scope="row"|2011
| Born Villain
| "Too Much Ass for TV"
| 
|style="text-align:center;"|
|}

Pollstar Concert Industry Awards
The Pollstar Concert Industry Awards is an awards show held annually by trade publication Pollstar. First held in 1984, its aim is to honor various aspects of the concert industry, including musicians and tours, as well as the best venues, promoters and booking agents.

!
|-
!scope="row"|1996
| "Dead to the World Tour" 
| Club Tour of the Year 
| 
| style="text-align:center;"|

Q Awards
The Q Awards are an annual awards show first held in 1993 and founded by British music magazine Q. Marilyn Manson have received one nomination.

!
|-
!scope="row"|2002
|"Tainted Love"
|Best Video
|
|style="text-align:center;"|
|}

Revolver Golden Gods Awards
The Revolver Golden Gods Awards are an annual awards show first held in 2009 and founded by British hard rock magazine Revolver. Marilyn Manson have received one nomination.

!
|-
!scope="row"|2013
|Born Villain
|Album of the Year
|
|style="text-align:center;"|
|}

South Florida Slammie Awards
The South Florida Slammie Awards was an awards ceremony founded by Slammie Productions, which ran from 1992 until 1999. It was dedicated to honoring bands from South Florida's metal, punk and hardcore rock communities. Marilyn Manson won nine awards from nine nominations, making them the third-most decorated band in the awards' history. Only Load and Amboog-a-Lard, the latter being bassist Twiggy Ramirez's former band, won more awards (10 each).

!
|-
!scope="row" rowspan="2"|1993
|"Dope Hat"
|Song of the Year
|
|rowspan="2" style="text-align:center;"|
|-
|rowspan="2"|Marilyn Manson
|rowspan="2"|Band of the Year
|
|-
!scope="row" rowspan="2"|1994
|
|rowspan="2" style="text-align:center;"|
|-
|Marilyn Manson
|Vocalist of the Year
|
|-
!scope="row" rowspan="2"|1995
|"Lunchbox"
|Best Single
|
|rowspan="2" style="text-align:center;"|
|-
|Portrait of an American Family
|rowspan="2"|Best National Release
|
|-
!scope="row" rowspan="3"|1996
|Smells Like Children
|
|rowspan="3" style="text-align:center;"|
|-
|Marilyn Manson
|Vocalist of the Year
|
|-
|"Sweet Dreams (Are Made of This)"
|Best Single
|
|}

Miscellaneous awards and honors

Martin Popoff
Martin Popoff is a Canadian music journalist and critic who covers the genre of heavy metal music. He is the senior editor and co-founder of Brave Words & Bloody Knuckles, and he has additionally written over twenty books that both critically evaluate and document the history of heavy metal. Popoff compiled The Top 500 Heavy Metal Albums of All Time and The Top 500 Heavy Metal Songs of All Time by asking fans, musicians and journalists to create numbered lists of their favorite albums and songs. Almost 18,000 individual votes were tallied and entered into a database, from which the final rankings were derived. Each book contains one release by Marilyn Manson.

!
|-
! scope="row"| 2003
|"The Beautiful People"
|The Top 500 Heavy Metal Songs of All Time
|align="center" |#206
|style="text-align:center;"|
|-
! scope="row"| 2004
|Mechanical Animals
|The Top 500 Heavy Metal Albums of All Time
|align="center" |#483
|style="text-align:center;"|
|-
|}

Miami New Times
The Miami New Times is a weekly newspaper based in Miami since 1987. The publication named Marilyn Manson and the Spooky Kids the 'Best Local Heavy Metal Band' in 1992.

!
|-
!scope="row"|1992
|Marilyn Manson and the Spooky Kids
|Best Local Heavy Metal Band
|
|style="text-align:center;"|
|}

Rolling Stone
Rolling Stone is a biweekly magazine founded in 1967 by publisher Jann Wenner and music critic Ralph J. Gleason. Marilyn Manson were named 'Best New Artist' by the publication in 1997, and in 2015 The Pale Emperor was dubbed the 'Best Metal Album of 2015'.

!
|-
!scope="row"|1997
|Marilyn Manson
|Best New Artist
|
|style="text-align:center;"|
|-
!scope="row"|2015
|The Pale Emperor
|Best Metal Album 
|
|style="text-align:center;"| 
|}

Žebřík Music Awards

!Ref.–
|-
| 1996
| rowspan=5|Marilyn Manson
| rowspan=2|Best International Surprise
| 
| 
|-
| rowspan=6|1998
| 
| rowspan=25|
|-
| Best International Male
| 
|-
| Best International Personality
| 
|-
| Best International Průser
| 
|-
| Mechanical Animals
| Best International Album
| 
|-
| "The Dope Show"
| Best International Video
| 
|-
| rowspan=3|1999
| rowspan=8|Marilyn Manson
| Best International Male
| 
|-
| Best International Personality
| 
|-
| rowspan=2|Best International Průser
| 
|-
| rowspan=8|2000
| 
|-
| Best International Male
| 
|-
| Best International Group
| 
|-
| Best International Personality
| 
|-
| Best International Surprise
| 
|-
| Holy Wood
| Best International Album
| 
|-
| rowspan=2|"Disposable Teens"
| Best International Song
| 
|-
| rowspan=2|Best International Video
| 
|-
| rowspan=3|2001
| "The Nobodies"
| 
|-
| rowspan=4|Marilyn Manson
| Best International Group
| 
|-
| rowspan=2|Best International Male
| 
|-
| rowspan=5|2003
| 
|-
| Best International Personality
| 
|-
| The Golden Age of Grotesque
| Best International Album
| 
|-
| rowspan=2|"This Is the New Shit"
| Best International Song
| 
|-
| Best International Video
| 
|-
| rowspan=2|2005
| rowspan=2|Marilyn Manson
| Best International Male
| 
| rowspan=2|
|-
| Best International Personality
|

Notes

References

Awards
Lists of awards received by American musician
Lists of awards received by musical group